Death to America is an anti-American political slogan. It is used in Iran, Afghanistan, Lebanon, Yemen, Iraq, and Pakistan. It has been used in Iran since the inception of the Iranian Revolution in 1979. Ruhollah Khomeini, the first Supreme Leader of the Islamic Republic of Iran, popularized the term. He opposed the chant for radio and television, but not for protests and other occasions.

The literal meaning of the Persian phrase "Marg bar Āmrikā" is "Death to America".
In most official Iranian translations, the phrase is translated into English as the less crude "Down with America". The chant "Death to America" has come to be employed by various anti-American groups and protesters worldwide.

Iranian officials generally explain that the slogan in its historical context has been provoked by U.S. government's hostile policies towards Iran and expresses outrage at those policies, and does not wish for literal death for American people themselves. In a speech to university students, Iran's Supreme Leader, Khamenei, interpreted the slogan as "death to the U.S.'s policies, death to arrogance". Following a meeting with Army and Air Force commanders, Khamenei declared that the Iranian people are not against American people, but that "Death to America" means down with American leaders, in this case Donald Trump, John Bolton, and Mike Pompeo.

History

Following the fall of the pro-American Pahlavi dynasty in early 1979, Iranian protesters regularly shouted "Death to America" and "Death to the Shah" outside the U.S. embassy in Tehran, including the day the embassy was seized on November 4, 1979, which commenced the Iran hostage crisis. Throughout the crisis, Iranians surrounding the embassy chanted "Death to America" and "Death to Carter." When Iran released the remaining 52 American hostages on January 20, 1981, they were led through a gauntlet of students forming parallel lines that shouted "Death to America" as they boarded the airplane that would fly them out of Tehran. "Death to the Soviet Union" and "Death to England" also became popular. A similar slogan "Death to Israel" is also used, and regularly chanted in Iranian and Pakistani political rallies. It is the best-known variation.

Throughout the existence of the Islamic Republic of Iran, the slogan has formed a pillar of its revolutionary values. It is regularly chanted at Friday prayers and other public events, which is often accompanied by a burning of the flag of the United States. These events include the November 4 anniversary of the U.S. embassy seizure, which Iranian leaders declared in 1987 as a national holiday, called "Death to America Day." State-sponsored murals that feature the slogan "Death to America" are common in Iranian cities, particularly Tehran.

However, according to Hashemi Rafsanjani, Khomeini agreed in principle to drop the usage of the slogan in 1984. Rafsanjani's statement was rejected by his hard line opponents who said that "The Imam throughout his life called America 'the Great Satan'. He believed that all the Muslims' problems were caused by America."

According to Politico magazine, following the September 11 attacks, Sayyed Ali Khamenei, the Supreme Leader of Iran, "suspended the usual 'Death to America' chants at Friday prayers" temporarily.

On March 21, 2015, Iran's Supreme Leader Ali Khamenei backed and shouted the phrase 'Death to America' while addressing a public gathering in Iran, during the holiday of Nowruz, the Persian New Year. In a statement published on his website on November 3, 2015, Khamenei said: "It goes without saying that the slogan does not mean death to the American nation; this slogan means death to the U.S.'s policies, death to arrogance."

On June 23, 2017, during Quds Day, protestors chanted "Death to America" and "Death to Israel". On April 25, 2018, Iran announced that a "Death to America" emoji would be included in a domestically produced messaging app. On May 9, 2018, an American flag was burned in the Iranian Parliament amidst chants of 'Death to America' after President Donald Trump withdrew from the nuclear deal with Iran. On November 4, 2018, Louis Farrakhan, the leader of the religious group Nation of Islam, led a "Death to America" chant during a solidarity trip to Iran, ahead of sanctions expected to be imposed by the Trump administration.

Many anti-Iranian government protesters, both within Iran and abroad, used similar phrases to demonstrate against the theocratic government. Slogans such as "Death to Khamenei", "Death to the Dictator" and "Death to Islamic Republic" have been chanted in those occasions, the latest being the Mahsa Amini protests, which began in September 2022. Protesters also refused to trample over giant U.S. and Israeli flags that had been painted on the ground of the universities, which was praised by President Donald Trump in 2020. At the funeral of Qasem Soleimani, the chant "Death to America" could be heard from many mourners across Baghdad, Islamabad, Karachi and many other cities.

Usage in the Middle East

Supporters of Hezbollah, the Shi'a Islamic militant group based in Lebanon that is closely aligned to Iran, regularly chant "Death to America" in street demonstrations. A week before the March 20, 2003 U.S. invasion of Iraq, Hezbollah Secretary General Hassan Nasrallah declared, "In the past, when the Marines were in Beirut, we screamed, 'Death to America!' Today, when the region is being filled with hundreds of thousands of American soldiers, 'Death to America!' was, is and will stay our slogan."

The slogan of the Houthis, a Shiite rebel group in Yemen also supported by Iran, is "God is Great, Death to America, Death to Israel, A curse upon the Jews, Victory to Islam."

Interpretation and meaning
Mohammad Nahavandian, chief of staff for Iranian (former) President Hassan Rouhani has said that:

"Regarding the words 'Death to America', we mean American politics, not the American people", says Hussein al Hamran, head of Foreign Relations for Ansar Allah (Houthis). Ali al-Bukhayti, a former spokesperson and official media face of the Houthis, has said: "We do not really want death to anyone. The slogan is simply against the interference of those governments [i.e. US, and Israel]".

Iranian president Hassan Rouhani has also dismissed the literal interpretation of the slogan, stating that the slogan is to express opposition to US intrusive policies rather than hatred against American people.

On 8 February 2019, Ali Khamenei stated "Death to America means death to Trump, Bolton and Pompeo. We criticize American politicians who are managing that country. Iranian nation are not against American people."

Travel writer Rick Steves recorded a taxi driver in Tehran exclaiming "Death to traffic!" in English, explaining that "when something frustrates us and we have no control over it, this is what we say". Steves compares the phrase to non-literal use of the word damn in American English.

See also
 Great Satan
 Global arrogance
 Iran–United States relations
 Slogans of the 1979 Iranian Revolution

References

Anti-Americanism
Iran–United States relations
Political terminology of Iran
1978 neologisms
Ruhollah Khomeini